Bonaparte's Retreat may refer to:

 "Bonaparte's Retreat" (Pee Wee King song), a 1949 American country music song, based on a traditional tune
 "The Bonny Bunch of Roses", an English folk song also known as "Bonaparte's Retreat"
 The Chieftains 6: Bonaparte's Retreat, an album that includes this tune
 One of the historical military defeats of the armies of Napoleon